also known as Hikakin (Japanese: ヒカキン) is a Japanese YouTuber and the co-founder of UUUM, a Japanese multi-channel network. A video of his Super Mario Bros. beatbox went viral in 2010, reaching over 3.8 million views by mid-September of that year. He, alongside fellow Japanese YouTuber Megwin, quit their day jobs in 2012 to focus entirely on their channels. He also collaborated with Gille, appearing in her promotions for her single "Try Again", where it is stated that he is one of the most popular Japanese YouTubers.

Biography 
In December 2012, Hikakin released his first album, a collaboration with video game music composer Hideki Sakamoto, for the soundtrack of the Echannel drawing application of the PlayStation Vita. In May 2013, Hikakin participated in the Social Star Awards and the subsequent Singapore Social concerts, performing with Aerosmith during their stage set and beatboxing before performing with the band on "Walk This Way".

In February 2014, Hikakin did a collaboration beatbox video with American singer Ariana Grande, beatboxing to her song "Baby I."

In October 2014, Hikakin was one of the performers for the first YouTube FanFest in Tokyo, Japan. At the same YouTube FanFest, Japanese breakbeat music duo Hifana performed with their instruments and using Hikakin's beatbox broken down into several parts, they created a new combination of his beatboxing and their instruments.

In December 2014, Hikakin went to New York City to do another collaboration video with Ariana Grande, doing a beatbox of that song, while she was singing "Break Free." In the same month, Hikakin uploaded a beatbox video that featured American singer Ne-Yo. They performed Ne-Yo's song "Coming with You" and his famous 2007 hit "Because of You."

On September 10, 2021, Hikakin reached 10 million subscribers on Hikakin TV.

Discography

Singles

Publications

Single author 
  (July 19, 2013, Housewife and Lifesha) 
   (October 30, 2014, Nikkei BP)

References

External links

1989 births
People from Niigata Prefecture
Living people
Japanese beatboxers
Japanese male musicians
Music YouTubers
Gaming YouTubers
YouTube vloggers
Japanese bloggers
Japanese YouTubers